Robert Townshend may refer to:
Robert Townshend (judge) (died 1555/56), English lawyer and judge
Robert Townshend (MP) (1580–?), English politician

See also
Robert Townsend (disambiguation)